Stenanthemum is a genus of flowering plants family Rhamnaceae and is endemic to Australia. Plants in the genus Stenanthemum are small shrubs usually lacking spines. The leaves are arranged alternately along the branches, simple, usually folded in half lengthwise on a short petiole. The flowers are arranged in dense heads, usually on the ends of branches with bracts at the base of the flowers, and there are sometimes whitish floral leaves. The flowers are bisexual, more or less sessile and have five sepals, five petals and a tube-shaped hypanthium, the petals hooded over the stamens. The fruit is a schizocarp containing spotted or mottled seeds.

Taxonomy
The genus Stenanthemum was first formally described in 1858 by Siegfried Reissek in the journal Linnaea. The genus name means "narrow flower".

List of species
The following is a list of species of Stenanthemum accepted by the Australian Plant Census as at November 2022:

Stenanthemum arens  (S.A.)
Stenanthemum argenteum  (Qld.)
Stenanthemum bilobum  (W.A.) (extinct)
Stenanthemum bremerense  (W.A.)
Stenanthemum centrale  (N.T.)
Stenanthemum complicatum  (W.A.)
Stenanthemum coronatum  (W.A.)
Stenanthemum cristatum  (W.A.) (presumed extinct)
Stenanthemum divaricatum  (W.A.)
Stenanthemum emarginatum  (W.A.)
Stenanthemum humile  (W.A.)
Stenanthemum intricatum  (W.A.)
Stenanthemum leucophractum  – rusty poison, white cryptandra, white stenanthemum(S.A., N.S.W., Vic.)
Stenanthemum liberum  (W.A.)
Stenanthemum limitatum  (W.A.)
Stenanthemum mediale  (W.A.)
Stenanthemum nanum  (W.A.)
Stenanthemum newbeyi  (W.A.)
Stenanthemum notiale  (W.A., S.A., Vic.)
Stenanthemum patens  (W.A.)
Stenanthemum petraeum  (W.A., N.T.)
Stenanthemum pimeleoides  – spreading stenanthemum, propellor plant (Tas.)
Stenanthemum poicilum  (W.A.)
Stenanthemum pomaderroides  (W.A.)
Stenanthemum pumilum  (W.A.)
Stenanthemum radiatum  (W.A.)
Stenanthemum reissekii  (W.A.)
Stenanthemum stipulosum  (W.A.)
Stenanthemum sublineare  (W.A.)
Stenanthemum tridentatum  (W.A.)
Stenanthemum yorkense  (W.A.)

References

Rhamnaceae
Rhamnaceae genera